Design for Leaving is a 1954 Warner Bros. Looney Tunes theatrical animated short directed by Robert McKimson. The cartoon was released on March 27, 1954 and stars Daffy Duck and Elmer Fudd. The title is a parody of the Design for Living House, House No. 4 in the Homes of Tomorrow Exhibition at the Century of Progress, the 1933 World's Fair in Chicago.

Plot
Reprising a salesman role that Daffy previously played in Daffy Dilly (1948), The Stupor Salesman (1948) and Fool Coverage (1952), Design for Leaving opens with Daffy as a fast-talking door-to-door salesman from the Acme Future-Antic Push-Button Home of Tomorrow Household Appliance Company, Inc. Daffy visits Elmer Fudd at his house as he is preparing to leave for work, and says that Acme has authorized him to install, at no cost, a complete line of ultra-modern automatic household appliances (on a 10-day free trial). Elmer tries to speak but is repeatedly interrupted by Daffy, who grabs Elmer by the arm and escorts him to a bus to take him to the office. Despite Elmer's protests that he has his own car, he is placed on a non-stop bus to Duluth.

Later that day, Elmer hitches a ride in a van from Duluth and returns home. Daffy greets Elmer at the front door and welcomes him to his new future-antic push button home. Elmer sees that his house is different and asks Daffy what he's done, but Daffy quickly pushes a button and a machine removes Elmer's hat and coat. Daffy then guides Elmer to a massaging chair.  Elmer likes it at first, but Daffy pushes a button and Elmer receives an aggressive massage, which dazes him. The chair then automatically puts a cigar in Elmer's mouth and lights it, but the smoke activates a robotic fire extinguisher from another room which douses Elmer with a bucket of water. Daffy states "It's, uh, very sensitive to heat. Probably needs adjusting", then guides Elmer into the kitchen. Daffy encourages Elmer to bask in the kitchen's "treasure trove of work-saving appliances" and demonstrates a new knife sharpener which ends up destroying the blade on one of Elmer's knives. Undaunted, Daffy points out the garbage disposal, which is revealed to be a pig which is housed under the kitchen sink (presumably because of budget cutbacks).

Daffy then shows Elmer the "main control panel" which operates all of the new appliances. Daffy suggests what Elmer would do if the walls were dirty. Elmer simply says that he would scrub them, though Daffy pushes a button marked "Wall Cleaner" and a robotic device emerges to clean the walls but it removes Elmer's wallpaper instead (humorously defacing a portrait of a captain in the process by removing all but the captain and his underwear). Daffy tries to adjust the device but the adjustment causes it to start removing the plaster ("Oh! My walls are wuined!"). Daffy quickly deactivates it, then asks Elmer if he is tired of looking at his dirty windows; Daffy then summons a machine which covers Elmer's window with bricks, and says that he'll "never have to look at those dirty windows again". Elmer becomes angry, telling Daffy that "[he's] so angwy, [he's] burning up!" which again activates the fire extinguisher and Elmer is doused with another bucket of water ("I tried to warn you!"). Daffy tries to continue the demonstration, but Elmer objects, saying that something bad happens to him whenever Daffy pushes a button. So Daffy agrees to let Elmer push a button. Elmer spots an unmarked red button, saying in his distinct voice, "I think I'll push this wed one." Daffy stops Elmer, shouting, "No, no, no, no, no!  Not the WED one!  Don't EVER push the WED one!" Elmer pushes another button that reads "Burglar Alarm" and a mechanical dog comes out of the wall which bites him in the leg, and he screams in pain.

Daffy then takes Elmer into a bedroom and shows him a device which will automatically tie a neck tie, from the options of Bow, Four-in-hand, Five-in-hand, False Granny, Windsor, Smindsor and an unlabeled option. Daffy tries to demonstrate it, but mistakenly pushes the unmarked button, causing the machine to put Elmer in a noose ("Help! Get me down!"). Daffy shuts off the machine and casually refers to the noose as the "Alcatraz Ascot" as if it were a type of neck tie. Elmer is exhausted, telling Daffy that he wants all of the "push-button nonsense" removed and tries to go upstairs and take an aspirin, but cannot do so because his stairway has been removed. Daffy confidently boasts that there is no need to walk up stairs in a push-button home, and uses an elevator-like device to bring the "upstairs (to the) downstairs". Elmer seems impressed but asks what happens to the downstairs, and Daffy raises the upstairs which shows that everything downstairs has been destroyed. Elmer asks if there is "any more cwever gadgets to demonstwate, Mr. Smarty Salesman?", and when Daffy says no, Elmer makes a phone call but the conversation is inaudible. When Elmer hangs up there is a knock on his front door and a large crate is brought inside. Elmer opens the crate and starts the motor, telling Daffy about his new "future-antic push-button salesman ejector" which grabs Daffy by the shoulders and wheels him out of the house, kicking him repeatedly (it was done as revenge from Elmer).

With Daffy gone, Elmer remembers the red button and wonders "what that wed button is for?" Despite Daffy's warning to never touch it, Elmer's curiosity gets the better of him, and when he pushes it, a display reads "IN CASE OF TIDAL WAVE".  A hydraulic lift raises his house high into the air. Elmer looks out of the front door and Daffy flies by in a helicopter and delivers the final punch line, "For a small price, I can install this little blue button to get you down!".

Historical Perspective
Design for Leaving, released in 1954, references a door-to-door sales method dating back to days of the "Yankee Peddler" and the contemporaneous direct-selling tactics for Kirby vacuum cleaners, Fuller brushes, etc. This is contrasted with the post-World War II automation and modernization of the American home; Acme's innovations are at once prescient and outlandish contraptions featured in the 1933 Homes of Tomorrow Exhibition thus predating The Jetsons (with its robot maid and household gadgetry) by a decade.

Home media
Design for Leaving is available restored, uncensored and uncut, on the Looney Tunes Superstars-Daffy Duck:Frustrated Fowl DVD. However, in this release it was cropped to widescreen.

References

External links
 

1954 animated films
1954 short films
1954 films
1950s Warner Bros. animated short films
Looney Tunes shorts
Films directed by Robert McKimson
Daffy Duck films
Elmer Fudd films
Films scored by Carl Stalling
1950s English-language films
Films about salespeople